Hartill is a surname. Notable people with the surname include:

Billy Hartill (1905–1980), British footballer
Mark Hartill (born 1964), Australian rugby union player
Percy Hartill (1892–1964), British Anglican priest and author
Rob Hartill (born 1969), British computer programmer and web designer
William Hartill (1911–1971), British cricketer